The Parliament of Lesotho is the national legislature of Lesotho and consists of two chambers: the Senate (upper chamber) and the National Assembly (lower chamber).

See also

Politics of Lesotho
List of legislatures by country

External links
 

Politics of Lesotho
Political organisations based in Lesotho
Government of Lesotho
Lesotho
Lesotho
Lesotho